Elections to state legislatures were held on November 6, 2007. Seven legislative chambers in four states held regularly-scheduled elections. These off-year elections coincided with other state and local elections, including gubernatorial elections in three states. Both chambers of the Northern Mariana Islands were up as well. 

Democrats held control of both chambers of the New Jersey and Louisiana legislatures, and held control of the Mississippi House of Representatives. Meanwhile, Republicans held control of the Virginia House of Delegates. Meanwhile, Democrats gained control of the Virginia and Mississippi Senates, however, Democrats had only lost control of the latter chamber at the beginning of the year when Senators James Walley and Tommy Gollott switched parties from Democratic to Republican.

Additionally, Republicans lost control of the Tennessee Senate when Republican Senator Michael R. Williams became an Independent and the chamber became evenly divided with no one party in control.

Summary table 
Regularly-scheduled elections were held in 8 of the 99 state legislative chambers in the United States. Nationwide, regularly-scheduled elections were held for 578 of the 7,383 legislative seats. This table only covers regularly-scheduled elections; additional special elections took place concurrently with these regularly-scheduled elections.

Results

State-by-state

Upper houses

Lower houses

Results

Territories

Upper houses

Lower houses

See also 
 2007 United States gubernatorial elections

Notes

References 

 
State legislative elections
State legislature elections in the United States by year